McGoff is a surname. Notable people with the surname include:

John P. McGoff (1925–1998), American conservative newspaper publisher
Ruairi McGoff (born 1985), Canadian rugby league player

See also
McGuff

Surnames of Irish origin